Khanote  is a village in Jamshoro District, Sindh province, Pakistan. The hamlet, the oldest in the district, is located on the Indus River, and is served by the Indus Highway. It is known for its coal mining industries. Its population is around 10,000.

Populated places in Jamshoro District
Villages in Sindh